The Stockholm Youth Symphony Orchestra is a symphony orchestra based in Stockholm, Sweden, consisting of young musicians at a high school and college level. The orchestra was founded in 1978. It has toured many countries, including Egypt, China, Estonia, Hungary, and Portugal.

Conductors
 Wille Sundling (1978–2004)
 Glenn Mossop (2005– )

Discography
 Stockholms Ungdomssymfoniorkester spelar Bizet, Beethoven, Sibelius, Strauss, Hellmark (1989). Conductor Wille Sundling. Stockholms kommunala musikskola LP SKM 8901.
 Stockholms UngdomsSymfoniOrkester Live (1993). Conductor Wille Sundling, soloists Karin Mang-Habashi (soprano), Cecilia Zilliacus (violin), Nagi El Habashi (cello). Live recordings from the Stockholm Concert Hall in 1992 and 1993. SMCD 9301.
 Nordic mosaic – From Stockholm with Love (1997). Conductor Wille Sundling, soloists Åsa Wirdefeldt (violin), Martin Saving (viola), Gabriel Suovanen (barytone), Alexander Nordwall (oboe). SSKCD 9701.

Sources

External links
Stockholms ungdomssymfoniorkester

Swedish symphony orchestras
European youth orchestras